Brownie's Little Venus is a 1921 American silent short film written and directed by Fred Fishback for Century Film Company and starring Baby Peggy and Brownie the Wonder Dog. It premiered at the Rivoli Theatre in New York City, New York, United States, on September 11, 1921. It was released nationwide on September 14, 1921.

Cast
 Baby Peggy as Peggy
 Brownie the Wonder Dog as Brownie

Preservation status
It was rediscovered in Switzerland in 2010.

It was preserved by the UCLA Library Film & Television Archive.

References

External links
 

1921 films
1920s rediscovered films
American silent short films
1921 short films
Animated films about animals
Films about dogs
American comedy short films
American black-and-white films
Silent American comedy films
1921 comedy films
Rediscovered American films
1920s American films